The Sea Village (갯마을 - Gaetmaeul) is a 1965 South Korean film directed by Kim Soo-yong. It was chosen as Best Film at the Grand Bell Awards.

Plot
A woman in a fishing village is widowed when her husband dies in a fishing boat. She has a liaison with a mainland man who is drafted. She goes insane and waits on a mountain for the return of her husband. Based on a novel.

Cast
Shin Young-kyun: Sang-soo
Ko Eun-ah as Hae-soon
Lee Min-ja
Hwang Jung-seun as Seong-goo's mother
Jeon Gye-hyeon as Soon-im
Lee Nak-hoon as Seong-chil
Cho Yong-soo
Kim Jeong-ok
Kim Ok
Jeong Deuk-sun

Bibliography

Contemporary reviews
November 7, 1965. "「갯마을」시사회에 독자 3백여 명 초대 / 「주부생활」사서". The Chosun Ilbo.
November 9, 1965. "[연예수첩] 웃고 만난 한ㆍ미의『돌리』/ 『갯마을』ㆍ『시장』에 기대". The Dong-a Ilbo.
November 18, 1965. "[영화평] 새로운 시네포엠 시도「갯마을」(한)". The Chosun Ilbo.

Notes

External links

1960s Korean-language films
Best Picture Grand Bell Award winners
Films directed by Kim Soo-yong
South Korean drama films